John Mallet was a chemist.

John Mallet(t) may also refer to:

John Mallet (died 1570), MP for Bodmin
John Malet (c. 1573-1644), MP for Bath
John Mallett, rugby player